Robert V of Dreux ( – 22 March 1329), Count of Dreux and Braine, was the eldest son of John II of Dreux. His mother was Peronelle de Sully, the principal lady of Joan II, Countess of Burgundy's household. Robert was a supporter of Joan II's husband, Philip V of France. He succeeded his father as Count of Dreux in 1309 and reigned until his death in 1329. He married Marie d'Enghien in April 1321, but died without issue on 22 March 1329 in Braine and was succeeded by his brother, John III of Dreux.

References

Sources

Counts of Dreux
1293 births
1329 deaths
House of Dreux